The 2007 AIG Japan Open Tennis Championships was a tennis tournament played on outdoor hard courts. It was the 34th edition of the event known that year as the AIG Japan Open Tennis Championships, and was part of the International Series Gold of the 2007 ATP Tour, and of the Tier III Series of the 2007 WTA Tour. Both the men's and the women's events took place at the Ariake Coliseum in Tokyo, Japan, from October 1 through October 7, 2007.

The men's draw included ATP No. 8, US Open semifinalist, Auckland and Båstad champion David Ferrer, Wimbledon quarterfinalist, Halle winner Tomáš Berdych, and Wimbledon semifinalist, Estoril runner-up and Mumbai titlist Richard Gasquet. Also lined up were Las Vegas champion Lleyton Hewitt, Marseille and Halle semifinalist Jarkko Nieminen, Dmitry Tursunov, Ivo Karlović and Fernando Verdasco.

The women's field was led by WTA No. 8, Wimbledon, Memphis and Seoul champion Venus Williams, recent Stanford and New Haven doubles titlist Sania Mirza, and Seoul runner-up, Kolkata winner Maria Kirilenko. Also present were French Open and Wimbledon doubles finalist Ai Sugiyama, Guangzhou titlist Virginie Razzano, Akiko Morigami, Aiko Nakamura and Flavia Pennetta.

Finals

Men's singles

 David Ferrer defeated  Richard Gasquet, 6–1, 6–2
It was David Ferrer's 3rd title of the year and his 5th overall.

Women's singles

 Virginie Razzano defeated  Venus Williams, 4–6, 7–6(9–7), 6–4
It was Virginie Razzano's 2nd title this year, and overall.

Men's doubles

 Jordan Kerr /  Robert Lindstedt defeated  Frank Dancevic /  Stephen Huss, 6–3, 6–3

Women's doubles

 Sun Tiantian /  Yan Zi defeated  Chia-jung Chuang /  Vania King, 1–6, 6–2, [10–6]

External links
Official website
Men's Singles draw
Men's Doubles draw
Men's Qualifying Singles draw
Women's Singles, Doubles and Qualifying Singles draws

AIG Japan Open Tennis Championships
AIG Japan Open Tennis Championships
 
2007
AIG Japan Open Tennis Championships
Tennis Championships